Giulia Civita Franceschi (Naples, 1870 – 27 October 1957) was an Italian educator. She directed from 1913 to 1923 kindergarten ship Caracciolo where 750 scugnizzi (underclass Neapolitan street children) were rescued and educated with her own method, becoming "citizens".

Her experience, before being shut down by fascism, was studied worldwide, including a visit from a Japan state delegation in the twenties; she's also called "the Montessori of the sea".
An exhibition was opened on her story at the Sea Museum of Naples in 2009.

The Caracciolo was a corvette built in 1869 and donated by the Italian navy in 1913.

References 

Child refugees
19th-century Neapolitan people
20th-century Italian educators
1870 births
1957 deaths